Tilly-sur-Seulles (literally Tilly on Seulles) is a commune in the Calvados department in the Normandy region in northwestern France.

Population

Events
Each year, the international motocross takes place.

See also
Communes of the Calvados department
Operation Epsom

References

External links

Official site

Communes of Calvados (department)
Calvados communes articles needing translation from French Wikipedia